The Nutt–Trussell Building is a historic commercial building at 202 North Main Street in downtown Fordyce, Arkansas, USA. Built in 1883, this two-story structure was the first brick building erected in Fordyce, a railroad town in southwestern Arkansas. Its exterior was covered in stucco c. 1920. It was built by Robert Nutt, who operated a dry goods shop on the premises. It later housed the Bank of Fordyce, and its upper floor has a long history of use for social club meetings (notably local Masons), and also housed the city's first telephone exchange. The descendants of L. L. Trussell, a later owner, gave the building to the city in 2000 for use as a local history museum.

The building was listed on the National Register of Historic Places in 1992.

See also
National Register of Historic Places listings in Dallas County, Arkansas

References

Commercial buildings on the National Register of Historic Places in Arkansas
Buildings and structures completed in 1883
Buildings and structures in Fordyce, Arkansas
National Register of Historic Places in Dallas County, Arkansas
Historic district contributing properties in Arkansas